Azamat Khasanovich Kurachinov (born 22 December 1989) is a Russian professional football player.

Club career
He made his Russian Football National League debut for FC Salyut Belgorod on 30 July 2012 in a game against FC Ufa.

External links
 

1989 births
Living people
Russian footballers
Association football forwards
Russian people of Abkhazian descent
FC Dynamo Stavropol players
FC Salyut Belgorod players
FC Angusht Nazran players
FC Amkar Perm players
FC Sheksna Cherepovets players